The Awakening is the fourth extended play (EP) by South Korean girl group GFriend. The EP was released digitally and physically by Source Music on March 6, 2017 and distributed by LOEN Entertainment. The album consists of six songs, including the single "Fingertip".

The EP peaked atop the Gaon Album Chart and at number 5 on US World Albums. The EP has sold over 70,000 physical copies as of April 2017.

Commercial performance 
The Awakening debuted and peaked atop the Gaon Album Chart, on the chart issue dated March 5–11, 2017. The EP placed at number 5 on the chart for the month of March 2017, with 64,802 physical copies sold. The EP has sold over 73,492 physical copies as of April 2017. The EP also debuted at number 5 on the US World Albums chart, as the highest ranking debut of the week ending March 25, 2017.

Four songs from the EP entered the Gaon Digital Chart in its first week: "Fingertip" at number 2, "Hear the Wind Sing" at number 34, "Rain in the Spring Time" at number 94 and "Please Save My Earth" at number 99.

Track listing

Charts

Accolades

Music program awards

References

External links
 "Fingertip" on YouTube

GFriend EPs
2017 EPs
Korean-language EPs
Kakao M EPs
Hybe Corporation EPs